Tesař (feminine: Tesařová) is a Czech occupational surname literally meaning "carpenter". Notable people include:

 Heinz Tesar (born 1939), Austrian architect
 Jan Tesař (born 1990), Czech sprinter
 Jaroslav Tesař (born 1986), Czech footballer
 Linda Tesar (born c. 1961), American economist
 Lubor Tesař (born 1971), Czech cyclist
 Paul J. Tesar, American developmental biologist
 Pavel Tesař (born 1967), Czech cyclist
 Zdeněk Tesař (born 1964), Czech speedway rider

See also
 

Czech-language surnames
Occupational surnames